Smajić is a Bosnian surname. Its literal meaning of "descendant of Ismail" is similar to that of the Albanian surname Smajli and the Turkish family name İsmailoğlu and it may indicate Muslim religious affiliation of its bearers. People with the name include:
 Admir Smajić (born 1963), Bosnian former footballer
 Armin Smajić (born 1964), Bosnian football manager and former player
 Edin Smajić (born 1971), Bosnian footballer
 Edis Smajić (born 1999), Bosnian footballer
 Emir Smajic (born 1989), Swedish-Bosnian footballer 
 Haris Smajić (born 1960), former Bosnian footballer
 Kabir Smajić (born 1977), former Bosnian footballer
 Nera Smajić (born 1984), Bosnian-born Swedish former footballer
 Petar Smajić (1910–1985), Croatian painter
 Sulejman Smajić (born 1984), Bosnian footballer

References

Bosnian surnames
Patronymic surnames
Surnames from given names